Dorrien Paul Davies (b March 1964) is a Welsh Anglican priest: since 2017 he has been the Archdeacon of Carmarthen and Priest in charge of St Clears.

Davies was educated at University of Wales, Lampeter and ordained in 1989. After a curacy in Llanelli  he held incumbencies at Llanfihangel Ystrad, St Dogmaels and Dewisland. until his Archdeacon’s appointment. He was collated on 12 November 2017.

References

 

1964 births
Living people
Alumni of the University of Wales, Lampeter
Archdeacons of Carmarthen
20th-century Welsh Anglican priests
21st-century Welsh Anglican priests